S-phase index (SPI), is a measure of cell growth and viability, especially the capacity of tumor cells to proliferate. It is defined as the number of BrdU-incorporating cells relative to the volume of DNA staining determined from whole mount confocal analyses.

Only cells in the S phase will incorporate BrdU into their DNA structure, which assists in determining length of the cell cycle.

References

 Murphy, Terence D. "Drosophila skpA, a component of SCF ubiquitin ligases, regulates centrosome duplication independently of cyclin E accumulation", Journal of Cell Science 116, 2321-2332 (2003).

Cellular processes